Monocercops is a genus of moths in the family Gracillariidae.

Etymology
Monocercops is derived from the Greek monos (meaning one, single), cercos (tail) and ops (eye).

Species
Monocercops actinosema (Turner, 1923)
Monocercops nepalensis Kumata, 1989

Monocercops resplendens (Stainton, 1862)
Monocercops thoi Kumata, 1989 
Monocercops triangulata Kumata, 1989

References

External links
Global Taxonomic Database of Gracillariidae (Lepidoptera)

Acrocercopinae
Gracillarioidea genera